The Peak District Lead Mining Museum is located at Matlock Bath, Derbyshire, England. The museum has a mockup of a lead mine in which children may safely experience and explore how the miners, and in particular how children, were used in this dangerous aspect of England's industrial past.
The museum is housed inside Grand Pavilion, Matlock Bath.

See also 

Derbyshire lead mining history

External links 

Peak District Lead Mining Museum

Peak District Mines Historical Society

Tourist attractions of the Peak District
Museums in Derbyshire
Mining museums in England